Wolf Creek is a tributary of the Muskingum River in the U.S. state of Ohio. It consists of two forks: the muddy fork, which begins toward Barlow, and the Clear Fork, which begins toward Chesterhill.  The Clear Fork has interesting whitewater with a ledge called Chipmunk Falls and several interesting rapids which could be classified as up to class IV in difficulty.  Wolf Creek also is the site of the Wolf Creek Recreation Center which once was the site of a  lake but it was destroyed by a flash flood in 1950.  Now this area located near McConnelsville is mostly used for hunting, fishing and hiking.  The Clear Fork and Muddy Fork of Wolf Creek merge and enter the Muskingum River near Waterford.

See also
List of rivers of Ohio

References

Rivers of Ohio
Rivers of Washington County, Ohio
Rivers of Morgan County, Ohio